This is a list of minister from Raman Singh's third cabinet starting from December 9, 2013. Raman Singh is the leader of Bharatiya Janata Party was sworn in the Chief Ministers of Chhattisgarh in December 2003. Here is the list of the ministers of his ministry.

Council of Ministers

Former Ministers

See also 

 Government of Chhattisgarh
 Chhattisgarh Legislative Assembly
 Second Raman Singh ministry
 First Raman Singh ministry
 Ajit Jogi ministry

References

Chhattisgarh ministries
Bharatiya Janata Party state ministries
2013 in Indian politics
Cabinets established in 2013
Cabinets disestablished in 2018
2013 establishments in Chhattisgarh
2018 disestablishments in India